The World Water Council (WWC), also known as the Conseil Mondial de l'Eau (CME), is an international think tank. It was founded in 1996, with its headquarters in Marseille, France. It has 358 members (as of February 2020) which encompass organisations from the UN and intergovernmental organizations, the private sector (construction, engineering and manufacturing companies), governments and ministries, academic institutions, international organizations, local governments and civil society groups. Founders and constituent members of the World Water Council are the International Commission on Irrigation and Drainage, the International Union for Conservation of Nature (IUCN), the International Water Association (IWA), AquaFed (The International Federation of Private Water Operators), Suez Lyonnaise des Eaux, the United Nations agencies UNDP and UNESCO, as well as the World Bank.

Its stated mission is "to promote awareness, build political commitment and trigger action on critical water issues at all levels, including the highest decision-making level, to facilitate the efficient conservation, protection, development, planning, management, and use of water in all its dimensions on an environmentally sustainable basis for the benefit of all life on earth."

Every third year the World Water Council organizes the World Water Forum in close collaboration with the authorities of the hosting country. The Forum is the largest international event in the field of water. The 6th World Water Forum took place in Marseille, France, in 2012 and the 7th World Water Forum in Daegu-Gyeongbuk, Republic of Korea, in April 2015. The 8th World Water Forum took place in Brasilia, Brazil, from 18 to 23 March 2018 under the overarching theme 'Sharing Water'. The 9th World Water Forum will be held in Dakar, Senegal, in March 2021.

The World Water Council is financed primarily through membership fees, and additional support is provided by the host City of Marseille. Specific projects and programs are financed through donations and grants from governments, international organizations, and NGOs.

Colleges and membership distribution (as of February 2020)
World Water Council members are divided into 5 colleges:
 College 1: Intergovernmental organizations - 4%
 College 2: Governments and government promoted organizations - 22%
 College 3: Commercial organizations - 22%
 College 4: Civil society organizations - 22%
 College 5: Professional and academic organizations - 31%

Criticism 
Critics pin on the World Water Council for promotion of  privatisation of water supply, an indication of which is a great influence of financial institutions and global water corporations. The Canadian activist Tony Clarke describes the World Water Council as a smoke screen for the water lobby. Medha Patkar, an activist from India, gave a passionate speech against privatization of water at the 2nd World Water Forum in The Hague in 2000.

The World Water Forum

References

External links
 Ninth World Water Forum (Dakar, 2021) 
 Eighth World Water Forum (Brasilia 2018) 
 Seventh World Water Forum (Daegu-Gyeongbuk 2015) 
 Sixth World Water Forum (Marseille 2012) 
 Fifth World Water Forum (Istanbul 2009) 
 World Water Council
 Water and habitat section - ICRC web site
 Fourth World Water Forum (México 2006)
 Medha Patkar at the 2nd World Water Forum, The Hague, March 2000

Organizations based in Marseille
International organizations based in France
International water associations
Water security
Water privatization
Think tanks based in France